The Canberra Times is a daily newspaper in Canberra, Australia, which is published by Australian Community Media. It was founded in 1926, and has changed ownership and format several times.

History
The Canberra Times was launched in 1926 by Thomas Shakespeare along with his oldest son Arthur Shakespeare and two younger sons Christopher and James. The newspaper's headquarters were originally located in the Civic retail precinct, in Cooyong Street and Mort Street, in blocks bought by Thomas Shakespeare in the first sale of Canberra leases in 1924.

The newspaper's first issue was published on 3 September 1926. It was the second paper to be printed in the city, the first being The Federal Capital Pioneer. Between September 1926 and February 1928, the newspaper was a weekly issue. The first daily issue was 28 February 1928. In June 1956, The Canberra Times converted from broadsheet to tabloid format.

Arthur Shakespeare sold the paper to John Fairfax Ltd in 1964, on the condition that it continue to advocate for Canberra. Soon after, in July 1964, the format was switched back to broadsheet and printing was moved to Fairfax's newly installed press in Fyshwick. Offices remained open in the Civic retail precinct until April 1987 when The Canberra Times moved its entire operation to the new office of The Federal Capital Press of Australia, also in Fyshwick.

The paper was later sold to Publishing and Broadcasting Limited, which in turn sold it to Kerry Stokes in 1989 for $110 million. Rural Press Limited bought the paper from Stokes in 1998 for $160 million. The Times rejoined the Fairfax stable in 2007 when Rural Press merged with Fairfax. The paper first went online on 31 March 1997.

In 2008, The Canberra Times printed a formal apology after the paper published an essay in which Irfan Yusuf falsely accused American historian Daniel Pipes of suggesting that Muslims deserved to be slaughtered as Jews were during The Holocaust.

On 17 October 2008, The Canberra Times was distributed with a sticker advertising the ACT Labor Party on the front page. Complaints about the sticker prompted the general manager, Ken Nichols, to issue an explanation.

In October 2013, Fairfax Media announced that The Canberra Times would be restructured to join the Australian Community Media Group of regional, agricultural and community newspapers, shifting from the metropolitan news division of Fairfax. A new editorial leadership team was appointed in November 2015, with Grant Newton as editor of the newspaper and Scott Hannaford as deputy editor and news director.

In March 2016, staff at the newspaper were told there would be a restructure at The Canberra Times and that the paper would move from a broadsheet format to a tabloid. Fairfax Media also announced they would be cutting 12 jobs from the newspaper's staff.

In 2021, the Canberra Times moved from its Fyshwick headquarters to an office complex on Marcus Clarke Street in Civic.

Notable staff
The paper's editors have included Jack Waterford and Michelle Grattan (1993–95), the first female editor of a metropolitan daily newspaper in Australia. A recent editor-in-chief, Peter Fray, left in January 2009 to edit The Sydney Morning Herald. He was succeeded by Rod Quinn, who announced the formation of a new senior editorial team in 2012.

Editorial cartoonists have included Geoff Pryor, David Pope and Pat Campbell.

See also
 List of newspapers in Australia

References

External links
 The Canberra Times
 

Newspapers published in Australian Capital Territory
Mass media in Canberra
Publications established in 1926
1926 establishments in Australia
Fairfax Media
Daily newspapers published in Australia
Newspapers on Trove